Tenguella hoffmani is a species of sea snail, a marine gastropod mollusk, in the family Muricidae, the murex snails or rock snails.

Distribution
This species occurs in Oman.

References

hoffmani
Gastropods described in 2017